Stephen Marshall Wilson (born July 8, 1969) is an American politician who served in the West Virginia House of Delegates from the 60th district from 2016 to 2020. On December 17, 2019 Wilson announced his change in party affiliation from Republican to Independent. Wilson unsuccessfully ran in the 2020 West Virginia Governor election. He teaches an American Federal Government Course at Blue Ridge Community and Technical College in Berkeley County, West Virginia.

References

1969 births
Living people
Members of the West Virginia House of Delegates
West Virginia Independents
West Virginia Republicans
People from South Carolina
21st-century American politicians